The following is the results from the Judo Competition at the 1967 Pan American Games, held from July 23 to August 6, 1967 in Winnipeg, Manitoba, Canada. The men's-only competition was organized into six weight divisions.

Men's competition

Men's Featherweight (-63 kg)

Men's Lightweight (-70 kg)

Men's Middleweight (-80 kg)

Men's Light Heavyweight (-93 kg)

Men's Heavyweight (+93 kg)

Men's Open

Medal table

1967
1967 Pan American Games
American Games
Judo competitions in Canada
International sports competitions hosted by Canada